Brimington is a civil parish in the Borough of Chesterfield, Derbyshire, England.  The parish contains 14 listed buildings that are recorded in the National Heritage List for England.  Of these, one is listed at Grade II*, the middle of the three grades, and the others are at Grade II, the lowest grade.  The parish contains the village of Brimington and the surrounding area, and the listed buildings consist of houses and associated structures, a church, part of a school, and a set of war memorial gates.


Key

Buildings

References

Citations

Sources

 

Lists of listed buildings in Derbyshire